
Nuevo Mundo Lake is a lake in the Beni Department and Santa Cruz Department, Bolivia.

Lakes of Beni Department
Lakes of Santa Cruz Department (Bolivia)